The Montreal Symphony House is a concert hall in Montreal, Quebec, Canada. The Montreal Symphony House is located at the corner of de Maisonneuve Boulevard West and Saint Urbain Street, on the northeastern esplanade of Place des Arts in the Quartier des Spectacles.

Construction began in May 2009 and the concert hall was inaugurated September 7, 2011. Initial plans were to name the 1,900-seat venue "Adresse symphonique", however the Quebec government announced on opening day that the hall would be the "Maison symphonique". The hall is home to the Montreal Symphony Orchestra, the Metropolitan Orchestra, I Musici de Montreal, Les Violons du Roy and other classical music ensembles.

On May 24, 2014, the hall inaugurated a $4,000,000 organ (op.3900) by Casavant Frères.  The four manual, 83 rank work contains 6,489 pipes. The instrument was a gift of Jacqueline Desmarais in memory of her husband, financier Paul Desmarais.

In 2014, SNC-Lavalin sold its concession rights in a deal worth some  $77.6 million.  SNC will continue to operate and maintain services for the owner, IA Financial Group, until 2038.

See also
List of concert halls

References

External links

 Site du Gouvernement du Québec 
 Site officiel de l'Adresse symphonique 
 Programmation Maison symphonique de Montréal 

Concert halls in Canada
Music venues in Montreal
Music venues completed in 2011
Quartier des spectacles
Public–private partnership projects in Canada